The 2008–2009 Panonian League Season was the fourth and final season of the league. Like in the previous season, the teams came from only two countries - Croatia and Serbia. The same teams participated, and there were playoffs. The season started earlier, on September 30, and lasted until February 15, 2008.

HK Vojvodina won the league playoffs. This was the first time a Serbian team won this cross-border league. In the finals, HK Vojvodina beat HK Partizan. The two teams would also reach the finals for the Serbian championship one month later.

Teams
 KHL Mladost
 KHL Zagreb
 HK Beostar
 HK Novi Sad
 HK Partizan
 HK Vojvodina
 KHK Crvena Zvezda

Final standings

Playoffs

Semifinals
The semifinals were held on February 6 & February 9, 2009.
HK Partizan swept HK Novi Sad 2-0. Game 1 was forfeited by HK Novi Sad.
Game 1 - Partizan - Novi Sad 5-0 (forfeit)
Game 2 - Novi Sad - Partizan 6-11 (2-3,3-3,1-5)
HK Vojvodina swept HK Crvena Zvezda in a best of three series.
Game 1 - Crvena Zvezda - Vojvodina 4-5 (2-2,0-2,2-1)
Game 2 - Vojvodina - Crvena Zvezda 4-1 (1-0,1-0,2-1)

Finals
The finals were scheduled for 13, 16, 19, 22 and 25 February 2009.
HK Vojvodina beat HK Partizan in a best of five series.
Game 1 - Partizan - Vojvodina 4-5 (1-3,1-0,2-2)
Game 2 - Vojvodina - Partizan 6-2 (1-1,2-1,3-0)
Game 3 - Partizan - Vojvodina 4-2 (2-0,0-2,2-0)
Game 4 - Vojvodina - Partizan 2-1 (1-0,1-0,0-1)

Third Place
The third place competition was held on February 13 & February 16, 2009.
HK Crvena Zvezda swept HK Novi Sad in a best of three series.
Game 1 - Crvena Zvezda - Novi Sad 8-3 (1-0,4-0,3-3)
Game 2 - Novi Sad - Crvena Zvezda 0-4 (0-0,0-3,0-1)

Scoring Leaders

Games

Regular season
30/09/2008 Partizan - Zagreb 2-3 t.a.b. (1-0,0-1,1-1,0-0,0-1)
06/10/2008 Mladost - Partizan 1-6 (1-4,0-2,0-0)
07/10/2008 Crvena Zvezda - Zagreb 6-3 (1-1,4-0,1-2)
13/10/2008 Mladost - Novi Sad 8-4 (1-1,5-1,2-2)
14/10/2008 Vojvodina - Zagreb 6-1 (1-1,4-0,1-0)
24/10/2008 Zagreb - Mladost 3-9 (1-2,1-5,1-2)
28/10/2008 Crvena Zvezda - Mladost 5-0 by forfeit
11/11/2008 Novi Sad - Crvena Zvezda 1-0 t.a.b. (0-0,0-0,1-0)*
11/11/2008 Beostar - Vojvodina 1-6 (0-0,0-2,1-4)
14/11/2008 Crvena Zvezda - Beostar 4-2 (2-0,1-2,1-0)
14/11/2008 Vojvodina - Partizan 2-3 (2-1,0-1,0-1)
17/11/2008 Mladost - Beostar 5-4 t.a.b. (1-3,0-1,3-0,0-0,1-0)
18/11/2008 Novi Sad - Partizan 1-6 (1-2,0-2,0-2)
18/11/2008 Crvena Zvezda - Vojvodina 7-1 (2-1,2-0,3-0)
21/11/2008 Novi Sad - Zagreb 7-4 (2-2,2-1,3-1)
22/11/2008 Beostar - Zagreb 1-3 (0-1,0-1,1-1)
22/11/2008 Partizan - Crvena Zvezda 3-0 (0-0,2-0,1-0)
25/11/2008 Zagreb - Crvena Zvezda 1-0 (0-0,0-0,1-0)
25/11/2008 Beostar - Novi Sad 3-1 (2-1,0-0,1-0)
28/11/2008 Partizan - Beostar 8-4 (3-0,2-3,3-1)
28/11/2008 Vojvodina - Novi Sad 6-2 (1-1,4-1,1-0)
01/12/2008 Vojvodina - Mladost 6-3 (2-2,2-0,2-1)
02/12/2008 Zagreb - Partizan 3-4 t.a.b. (0-1,3-2,0-0,0-0,0-1)
02/12/2008 Crvena Zvezda - Novi Sad 8-6 (5-1,3-4,0-1)
05/12/2008 Partizan - Vojvodina 6-3 (1-1,5-1,0-1)
05/12/2008 Beostar - Crvena Zvezda 0-6 (0-0,0-2,0-4)
09/12/2008 Crvena Zvezda - Partizan 1-5 (0-1,1-3,0-1)
09/12/2008 Novi Sad - Beostar 9-0 (5-0,3-0,1-0)
12/12/2008 Vojvodina - Beostar 2-1 (0-0,1-0,1-1)
21/12/2008 Partizan - Mladost 15-3 (6-1,5-1,4-1)
22/12/2008 Beostar - Mladost 0-8 (0-2,0-3,0-3)
10/01/2009 Vojvodina - Crvena Zvezda 5-4 (1-2,2-1,2-1)
10/01/2009 Beostar - Partizan 0-12 (0-4,0-3,0-5)
12/01/2009 Mladost - Crvena Zvezda 3-7 (0-2,1-3,2-2)
13/01/2009 Novi Sad - Vojvodina 5-3 (3-1,0-1,2-1)
19/01/2009 Mladost - Zagreb 5-4 (2-1,2-1,1-2)
20/01/2009 Zagreb - Novi Sad 3-7 (1-2,1-3,1-2)
24/01/2009 Partizan - Novi Sad 5-0 by forfeit
24/01/2009 Mladost - Vojvodina 5-6 (1-2,3-3,1-1)
Zagreb - Beostar 5-0 by forfeit
Novi Sad - Mladost 5-0 by forfeit
Zagreb - Vojvodina 5-0 by forfeit

External links
 Season 2008/09 at www.hockeyarchives.info
 Pannonian League 2008-09 at www.internationalhockey.net

Panonian League seasons
Panonian League